Zoir Murodulloyevich Dzhuraboyev ((), born 16 September 1998) is a Tajik professional footballer who plays for Neftchi Fergana and the Tajikistan national football team.

Career

Club
In July 2018, Dzhuraboyev moved to Uzbekistan Super League club Metallurg Bekabad.

On 26 February 2022, Istiklol announced that Dzhuraboyev had left the club to join Surkhon in the Uzbekistan Super League.

Career statistics

Club

International

Statistics accurate as of match played 25 September 2022

International goals
Scores and results list Tajikistan's goal tally first.

Honors
Istiklol
 Tajik League (3): 2019, 2020, 2021
 Tajik Cup (1): 2019, 
 Tajik Supercup (2): 2020, 2021

Tajikistan
King's Cup: 2022

References

1998 births
Living people
Tajikistani footballers
Tajikistan international footballers
Association football defenders
Tajikistan Higher League players
CSKA Pamir Dushanbe players
PFK Metallurg Bekabad players
FC Istiklol players